Errør Bøy (stylized as ERRØR BØY) is the debut studio album by American singer Lil Lotus, released through Epitaph Records, on August 20, 2021.

Background and recording 
Lil Lotus released his debut single "Romantic Disaster", featuring Chrissy Costanza, on May 25, 2021. For his debut album Lil Lotus worked with producers such as John Feldmann and Drew Fulk.

Themes and influences 
Errør Bøy's themes focus on overcoming drug addiction and toxic relationships.

Critical reception 
Kerrang! reviewer Jake Richardson praised the album, stating it "presents plenty of throwback moments", although said that there's "nothing overly original".

Track listing

Personnel 
 Lil Lotus – vocals
Chrissy Costanza – vocals (track 2)
 Travis Barker – drummer (track 9, track 12)
 John Feldmann – producer
 Drew Fulk – producer

References 

2021 debut albums
Epitaph Records albums
Pop punk albums